Orlando Nannini (born 12 July 1937) is an Argentine fencer. He competed in the individual and team foil events at the 1964 and 1968 Summer Olympics.

References

1937 births
Living people
Argentine male foil fencers
Olympic fencers of Argentina
Fencers at the 1964 Summer Olympics
Fencers at the 1968 Summer Olympics
Fencers from Buenos Aires
Pan American Games medalists in fencing
Pan American Games gold medalists for Argentina
Pan American Games silver medalists for Argentina
Pan American Games bronze medalists for Argentina
Fencers at the 1963 Pan American Games
Fencers at the 1967 Pan American Games
20th-century Argentine people